Osmar Coelho Claudiano (born February 23, 1982 in Varginha), or simply Osmar, is a Brazilian right back.

Honours
Pernambuco State League: 2005, 2007

Contract
Sport (Loan) 3 January 2007 to 31 December 2007
América-MG 2 January 2007 to 31 December 2010

External links
 
 
 
 

1982 births
Living people
Brazilian footballers
Campeonato Brasileiro Série B players
Campeonato Brasileiro Série C players
Campeonato Brasileiro Série D players
América Futebol Clube (MG) players
Santa Cruz Futebol Clube players
Sport Club do Recife players
Vila Nova Futebol Clube players
América Futebol Clube (RN) players
Associação Desportiva Recreativa e Cultural Icasa players
Red Bull Brasil players
Agremiação Sportiva Arapiraquense players
Treze Futebol Clube players
Tupi Football Club players
Volta Redonda FC players
Association football defenders